Jacob Dietrich (August 22, 1857 – February 6, 1932) was an American businessman and politician.

Born in Green Bay, Wisconsin, Dietrich moved with his parents to Cedarburg, Wisconsin. From 1882 to 1887, Dietrich lived in Bismarck, Dakota Territory where he was in the general store business. He then returned to Cedarburg, Wisconsin and was in the banking and real estate business. He was also secretary of the Ozaukee County Agricultural Society. Dietrich served on the Ozaukee County Board of Supervisors and was a Democrat. In 1913, Dietrich served in the Wisconsin State Assembly.

Notes

1857 births
1932 deaths
Politicians from Bismarck, North Dakota
Politicians from Green Bay, Wisconsin
People from Cedarburg, Wisconsin
Businesspeople from North Dakota
Businesspeople from Wisconsin
County supervisors in Wisconsin
Democratic Party members of the Wisconsin State Assembly